Peter of Narbonne was Bishop of Albara south east of Antioch from 1098–1100 after the Crusaders led by Robert of Normandy captured the city mostly inhabited by Muslims. Peter was ordained bishop as Peter I of Narbonne by John VII the Oxite, the (Greek) Eastern Orthodox Patriarch of Antioch. The appointment was made by the Patriarch because there was no Orthodox bishopric already established in Albara now populated by Christians. The new Latin bishop's elevation marked the beginning of a Latin Church resident in the East, greatly encouraged by the Crusaders to see the local Greek ecclesiastics replaced by Latin ones.

Peter of Narbonne's office was a precursor of the Latin Patriarchate of Antioch established two years later in Antioch headed by a Latin Patriarch, the first being Bernard of Valence named as first Latin Patriarch of Antioch, his rule extending from 1100 to 1135.

See also
Latin Patriarchate of Antioch

References

Date of birth unknown
Date of death unknown
11th-century Roman Catholic bishops in the Middle East
Clergy from Narbonne
Christians of the First Crusade